Javier Treviño (born December 11, 1960 in Monterrey, Mexico), was appointed Mexico Deputy Secretary of Education by President Enrique Peña Nieto on November 20, 2014. He was elected Member of Mexican Federal Congress (Diputado Federal) in 2012.

Javier Treviño combines a solid and successful business-government experience along his nine-year career of high-level corporate experience and 16 years of high-level government, political, communication and international experience.

Treviño is a Member of Mexico’s Congress (Diputado Federal, State of Nuevo León, Institutional Revolutionary Party - PRI). He serves as secretary of the Energy Committee and of the Finance Committee, and he is a member of the Migratory Affairs Committee and of the Special Committee on Information and Communication Technologies.

Treviño served as the Secretario General de Gobierno of the Mexican State of Nuevo León (Lieutenant Governor) from October 2009 to February 2012. As cabinet chief, he coordinated all government efforts in one of the most important States of Mexico.  He was the General Coordinator for the Transition Team of Nuevo León's Governor-elect in 2009. He was the Presidential Campaign Manager for Enrique Peña Nieto in the State of Nuevo León.

Treviño was the Senior Vice President of Corporate Communications and Public Affairs at CEMEX, the global building materials company, from March 2001 to September 2009. He took responsibility for coordinating CEMEX external and internal global communication and external relations. He was responsible for corporate media relations, strategic issue and coverage monitoring, corporate identity, brand communication strategy, public affairs and corporate social responsibility strategies. With a staff of well-trained professionals, Mr. Trevino coordinated company communication offices worldwide to develop and implement message initiatives and comprehensive communication and public affairs strategies.

Treviño began his public service career in 1987 as director of planning in Mexico's Education Department and later worked as a special adviser to the Press Secretary for the President of Mexico.

From 1989 to 1993, Treviño was posted to the Mexican Embassy in Washington, D.C., where he served as Spokesman and Minister for Press and Public Affairs during the period of negotiations that led to the North American Free Trade Agreement.

In early 1993, Treviño became a close adviser to then-Secretary of Social Development Luis Donaldo Colosio and joined Colosio's presidential campaign team later that year as strategy adviser and speechwriter.  In April 1994, Treviño was appointed senior adviser on international relations in Ernesto Zedillo's successful presidential campaign.

Treviño served in top posts in the Zedillo administration, including three years as Deputy Foreign Minister and two years as Deputy Finance Minister for Administration.

He is a frequent collaborator of national newspapers, including Milenio Daily and Reforma, where he writes about Mexican politics and international affairs, as well as a commentator in TV and radio shows. He has served as Vice President of the Mexican Council on International Affairs (Comexi), and he has been a member of the board of the Institute of the Americas, the Woodrow Wilson Center’s Mexico Institute, the OAS’ Trust for the Americas, the North American Center at Arizona State University, and of the Trust of El Colegio de México, a leading Mexican university and think tank.

Treviño holds a B.A. degree in International Relations from El Colegio de México and a Master in Public Policy degree from Harvard University's John F. Kennedy School of Government.

References

External links
 Javier Treviño
 Linkedin Profile
 Cámara de Diputados

1960 births
Living people
Politicians from Monterrey
El Colegio de México alumni
Harvard Kennedy School alumni
Members of the Chamber of Deputies (Mexico)
Institutional Revolutionary Party politicians
21st-century Mexican politicians
Deputies of the LXII Legislature of Mexico